Fausto Amodei (born 18 June 1935, in Turin) is an Italian folk singer-songwriter and musicologist.

Biography
Amodei began his musical career in 1958, founding the band Cantacronache. In his songs he uses irony and satire, a style inspired by the French singer Georges Brassens. In the early 1960s he became active in the magazine Nuovo Canzoniere Italiano and in 1966 he was elected member of the Italian parliament as a member of the Italian Socialist Party of Proletarian Unity (PSIUP). The singer Francesco Guccini cited Amodei in interviews and books as one of his principal influences as a composer.

One of Amodei's most famous songs is Per i morti di Reggio Emilia (For the Dead of Reggio Emilia), dedicated to the demonstrators killed by the police during a protest on 7 July 1960. In 1985 the Italian punk-rock band CCCP titled their third EP with the first verse of this ballad: Compagni, Cittadini, Fratelli, Partigiani.

Discography
The discography is listed in a chronological order.

1958 – La gelida manina (78 rpm)
1963 – Il barone e la pastora (EP)
1963 – Le canzoni di Fausto Amodei 1 (EP)
1963 – Le canzoni di Fausto Amodei 2 (EP)
1964 – Il tarlo/Il gallo (45 rpm)
1964 – Lettera dalla caserma/Una vita di carta (45 rpm)
1965 – Canzoni didascaliche (EP)
1969 – Sciopero interno/Nei reparti della FIAT (45 rpm)
1971 – Cantacronache 3 (album)
1972 – Se non-li conoscete (album)
1974 – L'ultima crociata (album)
2005 – Per fortuna c'è il cavaliere (album)

References

Literature
Margherita Zorzi: "Fausto Amodei – Canzoni di satira e di Rivolta" – 2008,

External links
Fausto Amodei on Discogs
 Biography and infos on www.sonorika.com 

1935 births
Living people
Italian folk singers
Italian male singer-songwriters
Italian singer-songwriters
Musicians from Turin